Aphera is a genus of sea snails, marine gastropod mollusks in the family Cancellariidae, the nutmeg snails.

Species
Species within the genus Aphera include:
 † Aphera islacolonis (Maury, 1917)
 Aphera lindae Petuch, 1987
 † Aphera scopalveus Finlay, 1926
 Aphera tessellata (G. B. Sowerby I, 1832)

References

 Hemmen J. (2007). Recent Cancellariidae. Wiesbaden, 428pp

External links

Cancellariidae